The 2021 Ladbrokes UK Open was a darts tournament staged by the Professional Darts Corporation. It was the nineteenth year of the tournament where players compete in a single elimination tournament to be crowned champion. The tournament was held for the first time at the Marshall Arena in Milton Keynes, England, between 5–7 March 2021, and was played behind closed doors due to the COVID-19 pandemic.

Michael van Gerwen was the defending champion after defeating Gerwyn Price 11–9 in the 2020 final. However, he lost 11–5 to Luke Humphries in the semi-finals.

Lisa Ashton became the first female to win a match at the UK Open since 2005, defeating Aaron Beeney 6–2 in Round 2, and also set a new world record for the highest televised average by a female player, with an average of 100.34. Sebastian Białecki, the first player born after the inaugural event in 2003 to play in the UK Open , hit a nine-dart finish in his opening round victory over Jim McEwan. Jitse van der Wal then hit a nine-dart finish against Białecki in the second round.

James Wade won his third UK Open title, and his first since 2011, with an 11–5 victory over Luke Humphries in the final.

Prize money
The prize fund remained at £450,000. With the withdrawal of seven tour card players the field is reduced to 153 players.

Format
There is a slight change in format for this year. Due to the COVID-19 pandemic, no Rileys amateur qualifiers could be held. In 2021, the top eight of both the UK and European Qualifying School Order of Merits who have not yet qualified for the tournament filled those 16 spots.

The 153 participants will enter the competition incrementally, with 50 players entering in the first round, with match winners joining the 32 players entering in the second and third rounds to leave the last 64 in the fourth round.

No players are seeded.
A random draw is held for each of the following rounds following the conclusion of the third round.
All matches in the first, second and third rounds will be played over best of 11 legs.
All matches in the fourth, fifth and sixth rounds and quarter-finals will be played over best of 19 legs.
All matches in the semi-finals and final will be played over best of 21 legs.
Eight boards will be used for matches in the first, second, third and fourth rounds.
Four boards will be used for matches in the fifth round.
Two boards will be used for matches in the sixth round.
One board will be used for all the matches in the quarter-finals, semi-finals and final.

Qualifiers
Boris Krčmar, Daniel Larsson, Darren Penhall, Wesley Harms, Michael Unterbuchner and Robert Marijanović withdrew before the draw was made.

Cristo Reyes and Florian Hempel withdrew after the draw took place, so their opponents Jitse van der Wal (in round 1) and Ryan Joyce (in round 3) both got byes to their next respective rounds. Justin Pipe tested positive for COVID-19, meaning Luke Humphries received a bye to round 4.

Number 1–32 of the PDC Order of Merit (receiving byes into fourth round)

Number 33–64 of the PDC Order of Merit (receiving byes into third round)

Number 65–96 of the PDC Order of Merit (receiving byes into second round)

Number 97–128 of the PDC Order of Merit (starting in first round)

PDC Development Tour qualifiers (starting in first round)
The top 8 ranked players from the 2020 Development Tour Order of Merit who didn't have a Tour Card for the 2021 season qualified for the first round.

PDC Challenge Tour qualifiers (starting in first round)
The top 8 ranked players from the 2020 Challenge Tour Order of Merit who didn't have a Tour Card for the 2021 season qualified for the first round.

PDC UK Qualifying School qualifiers (starting in first round)
The top 8 ranked players from the 2021 UK Qualifying School Order of Merit who didn't have a Tour Card for the 2021 season qualified for the first round.

PDC European Qualifying School qualifiers (starting in first round)
The top 8 ranked players from the 2021 European Qualifying School Order of Merit who didn't have a Tour Card for the 2021 season qualified for the first round.

Draw

Friday 5 March

First round (best of eleven legs)
With the withdrawal of the six Tour Card holders, six players received a bye to the second round.

Second round (best of eleven legs)

Third round (best of eleven legs)

Fourth round (best of nineteen legs)

Saturday 6 March

Fifth round (best of nineteen legs)

Sixth round (best of nineteen legs)

Sunday 7 March

Quarter-finals (best of nineteen legs)

Semi-finals and Final

References

UK Open
UK Open
UK Open
UK Open
Sport in Milton Keynes